Descendant is a 2003 film starring Katherine Heigl and Jeremy London based on the 1839 short story "The Fall of the House of Usher" by Edgar Allan Poe.

Plot

Ethan Poe, a writer living in the shadow of his infamous ancestor, is under deadline to finish his next book.  He moves to a small town to concentrate on his novel and meets Anne who falls for the troubled writer.  When the shadow of Poe's ghost falls over the two lovers women turn up murdered in Poe-etic fashion.  Ethan is the Police's prime suspect.  Is Anne next to be murdered?  Can she save herself from the dark curse on the Poe family?

Cast
 Jeremy London as Ethan Poe / Frederick Usher
 Katherine Heigl as Ann Hedgerow / Emily Hedgerow
 Nick Stabile as Deputy John Burns
 Arie Verveen as Edgar Allan Poe
 William Katt as Dr. Tom Murray
 Whitney Dylan as Lisa
 Matt Farnsworth as Keifer Hedgerow
 Margot Hartman as Margaret Usher (credited as Margot Hartman Tenney)
 Cheryl Dent as Camille Lane
 Lissa Pallo as Susan Smith
 Marilyn Burns as Dr. White
 Jodi Stevens as Rebecca Dodd
 Jenna Bodnar as Kate
 Craig Patton as Bartender
 Diane Foster as Vicki
 Amy Lindsay as Dee

References

External links
 

2003 drama films
2003 films
Films based on The Fall of the House of Usher
2000s English-language films
Films directed by Del Tenney